A woolshed is another name for a shearing shed.

Woolshed or Woolsheds may also refer to:
Woolsheds, South Australia northwest of Gawler
Woolshed Flat, South Australia, northwest of Rhynie in the southern Clare Valley
Woolshed, Queensland, suburb of Ipswich
Woolshed Flat, Victoria near Bendigo, Victoria

See also
Woolshed Flat (disambiguation)